Thomas Karpency (born January 10, 1986) is an American professional boxer who fights in the light heavyweight division. A professional since 2006, he is a three-time world title challenger; first challenging for the WBO and IBO light heavyweight titles in 2012, as well as the WBC light heavyweight title in 2015. He holds a notable upset win over former IBF and WBC title holder Chad Dawson.

Background
Karpency is from a "patch town" inside of Adah, Pennsylvania called "Palmer". There are four Palmer natives who are current professional boxers. Palmer has an approximate population of 200 people. Per capita, Palmer has one of the highest percentages of professional athletes in the United States. Karpency attended Albert Gallatin High School. During his last two years at Albert Gallatin, Karpency competed in wrestling, and was also an outstanding football player.

Boxing career

Early career
Karpency debuted in professional boxing at the age of 20 as a cruiserweight, after winning a Toughman contest. He has spent the majority of his career boxing on the American circuit managing to win the regional WBA Fedecentro title in 2009.

With a record of 19-1-1, Karpency made his overseas debut against Karo Murat in Germany for the WBO Inter-Continental Light Heavyweight title on May 1, 2010. Karpency was defeated via unanimous decision.

First world title shot
Two years later in February 2012, Karpency again went overseas to Cardiff, Wales, challenging Nathan Cleverly for the WBO light heavyweight title. Karpency was again defeated via unanimous decision.

Despite being handed his first world title challenge and loss, Karpency next fought Andrzej Fonfara for the IBO light heavyweight title nine months later. Karpency was defeated via TKO.

Following a two-year layoff from his consecutive world title defeats, Karpency returned to professional boxing in 2014 picking up two unanimous decision wins before facing former world title holder Chad Dawson on October 4, 2014. In a significant upset, Karpency won via split decision, picking up the biggest win of his career to date, and moved to 24-4-1.

Third world title shot
After winning the Pennsylvania light heavyweight title in his next fight, Karpency received another world title shot, this time for Adonis Stevenson's WBC title on September 11, 2015. Karpency was defeated via TKO.

A year later in 2016, Karpency made his return, getting a knockout win on the regional circuit before facing Oleksander Gvozdyk for the NABF light heavyweight title. Karpency was defeated by the current WBC light heavyweight champion via TKO. Karpency has since gone 3-0 (all TKO wins), fighting most recently as November 2018.

Personal life
Aside from boxing, Karpency is also a registered nurse. Karpency has two younger brothers who are also professional boxers; Jeremiah and Dan. "The Bullfrog" Jeremiah, age 28, fights in the heavyweight division (holding a record of 15-2-1) while Dan competes as a super welterweight and is 8–2.

Professional boxing record

References

External links
 

1986 births
Living people
People from Fayette County, Pennsylvania
Light-heavyweight boxers
Boxers from Pennsylvania
American male boxers
 American nurses